Gábor Rekettye (born July 12, 1944) is a Hungarian marketing author and professor. At present he is a Professor Emeritus at the University of Pécs and Honorary Professor at the University of Szeged.

Early life and career 
Until the age of 10 he lived in Villány, then he moved with his parents to Pécs. He finished the first cohort of German language at the Klára Leöwey High School in Pécs, then he went to Karl Marx University of Economic Sciences in Budapest where he received an MSc diploma in economics. He was the first in his family who attended any form of higher education, his parents also urged him to study foreign languages. After graduating, he returned to Pécs and became the Sales Manager of the famous Pécs Glove Factory, where he worked between 1967 and 1973. Then he became an Assistant Professor at the University of Pécs where he worked for 5 years. In 1978 he moved with his family to Budapest where he became the Deputy General Manager of a big foreign trading company, Tannimpex. Between 1984 and 1989 he served as Commercial Counsellor and as a head of the Hungarian Trade Mission in Tokyo, Japan. When he returned home in 1989, he went back to the University of Pécs where he became Assosciate Professor. After returning home, he attended a General Management programme at Harvard Business School in 1992 and the CEETP programme at the Kellogg Graduate School of Management in 1993. He became full professor in 1995. He served as a Dean of the Faculty of Business and Economics at the University of Pécs between 1993 and 1996. He has been teaching as a Visiting Professor in different countries such as the USA or the U.K.

Scientific degrees, titles 
 PhD at the Hungarian Academy of Sciences (HAS) 1984
 Doctor Habil, Janus Pannonius University, Pécs, 1994
 Doctor of the HAS, Budapest, 2003

Languages 
 Hungarian (native speaker)
 English (full working proficiency)
 German (limited working proficiency)

Awards 
  Award of Excellence by HAS (1977 and 2009)
 Order of Merit of Hungary for excellent work, awarded by the Hungarian Minister of Economy, 1983
 Winner of Case Competition (SEEMAN, Prague, 1997 and MATCH, Budapest-Indiana, 1999)
 Award of Excellence, University of Pécs (2001 and 2003)
 Best Hungarian Marketing Publication of the Year (1997, 2014, 2015 and 2018)
 Order of Merit of Hungary, Officer's Cross awarded by the President of Hungary in 2013

Subjects taught 
 Foundation Marketing
 International Marketing
 Marketing and Sales
 Product Policy
 Marketing Management
 New Product Policy
 Global Marketing

Works

Most important books: 
 Value Creation in Marketing (Together with Professor Gupta from Ohio University in Hungarian), 1997 and 1999
 The Significance of the Last Decade (In English), 2000
 Pricing in Marketing (In Hungarian), 1999, 2003 and 2004
 Marketing Theory and Practice (Both in English and Hungarian, together with 3 co-authors), 2004
 Decision Oriented Marketing (Both in English and Hungarian together with 3 co-authors), 2005
 Small Business Marketing (In Hungarian), 2007 and 2008
 Multidimensional Pricing (In Hungarian), 2011
 Marketing for the Hungarian Small Businesses (In Hungarian), 2012
 International Marketing (Together with János Fojtik in Hungarian), 2003 and 2009
 Introduction to Marketing (In Hungarian with 2 co-authors), 2015
 International Marketing (Together with Tamás Tóth and Erzsébet Malota in Hungarian), 2015
Value Creation 4.0 (In Hungarian), 2018
 Pricing the New Frontier (Together with Professor Jonathan Liu in English), Transnational Press London, 2018
Value Creation 4.0 - Marketing Products in the 21st Century, Transnational Press London, 2019
From Villány to Tokyo - The adventurous life of a foreign trader-diplomat-university professor (In Hungarian), Ad Librum, Budapest, 2020
From Villány to Tokyo, Transnational Press London, 2021 
Modern Pricing (Modern árazás – together with Pál Danyi and István Veres), Akadémiai Kiadó Budapest, 2021

Social activities 
 Chairman of the Hungary-Japan Economic Club (1989–2001)
 Chairman of the Hungarian Association of Marketing Educators (1993–1998)
 Chairman of the Scientific Committee of Marketing at the HAS (2005–2011)
 Member of the Editorial Board of Different International Journals
 Chairman of the Editorial Board of the Hungarian Journal of Marketing and Management (1995-)

References

External links 
 Interview from 2013
 Other notes from his publications
 Older notes from his publications
 Autobiography from 2009
 Elméleti igényességgel a gyakorlat igényei szerint... Notes for the 70th birthday of Gábor Rekettye; edited by: Fojtik János; Publikon, Pécs, 2014

1944 births
Living people
Hungarian writers
Corvinus University of Budapest alumni